The Kansas Army National Guard is a component of the Army National Guard and the Kansas National Guard.  Kansas Army National Guard units are trained and equipped as part of the United States Army.  The same ranks and insignia are used and National Guardsmen are eligible to receive all United States military awards. The Kansas Guard also bestows a number of state awards for local services rendered in or to the state of Kansas. It is, along with the Kansas Air National Guard, an element of the Kansas National Guard.

History
The forerunner of the Kansas National Guard, the Kansas Territorial Militia, was formed on August 30, 1855. On January 29, 1861, six years after the formation of the territorial militia, Kansas became the 34th state and the Kansas Militia was organized. Article 8, Section 4 of the Kansas Constitution designates the Governor of Kansas
as the commander in chief for state duties. The U.S. Congress passed the Militia Act of 1903, which organized the various state militias into the present National Guard system.

The Kansas Army National Guard has been involved in the nation's conflicts since the state's inception as a territory. The Kansas Guard actively participated in the Civil War, 1861–1865; the Indian Wars, 1864–1870; Spanish–American War, 1898–1899; and the Pancho Villa Expedition of 1916; and the First World War, 1917–1919.

The 2nd Infantry Regiment of the Kansas Volunteer Militia was organized from existing units in 1880. The regiment was mustered into federal service in June 1916 for duty guarding the Mexican Border against invasion. The regiment served for five months at Eagle Pass, Texas. In August 1917, the 2nd Infantry Regiment was drafted into federal service. The Kansas National Guard supplied troops to the 35th Infantry Division when it was organized in August 1917 as a formation with troops from Kansas and Missouri. The 2nd Infantry Regiment was consolidated with the 1st Infantry Regiment and re-designated the 137th Infantry Regiment, Kansas National Guard and assigned to the 35th Division. The regiment saw duty in France and participated in the Meuse-Argonne offensive. The 137th Infantry Regiment were demobilized in May 1919, after 34 months of active duty service. In November 1921, the 2nd Infantry Regiment was re-designated as the 161st Field Artillery Regiment and assigned to the 35th Division.

In 1918, Kansas Army National Guard Lieutenant Erwin R. Bleckley, who volunteered for aviation duty, was posthumously awarded the Medal of Honor for his actions during an aerial sortie during World War I. He was the first National Guard aviator to earn the award and one of only three to earn it during the 20th century.

Units of the Kansas Army National Guard fought in World War II and the Korean War from 1950 to 1952, when the 130th Field Artillery Group headquarters, the 195th Field Artillery Battalion, and the 174th Military Police Battalion were mobilized.

In 1963, the 69th Infantry Brigade was activated as part of the Kansas Army National Guard. During the Vietnam War, the brigade, less the 3rd Battalion of the 137th Infantry, was ordered to active duty in May 1968. The brigade served at Fort Carson attached to the 5th Infantry Division until its demobilization in December 1969. The brigade was used to provide replacements for troops in Vietnam. 40 men of the brigade were killed in action, with hundreds being wounded.

In the mid-1980s, two new Army National Guard divisions were formed, drawing on existing independent brigades. The headquarters of the 35th Infantry Division was reformed by the Kansas Army National Guard. The 69th Infantry Brigade joined the new division, alongside brigades from Nebraska and Kentucky. In the late 1980s, aviation regiments were formed within the U.S. Army and the Army National Guard. The state maintained the 69th Infantry Brigade as part of the 35th Infantry Division from the 1980s to the 1990s or later.

Kansas Army National Guard personnel also saw service during Operations Desert Shield/Desert Storm, 1990–1991; Operations Northern and Southern Watch in Southwest Asia, 1992–2002; Operation Restore Hope in Somalia, 1992–1993; Operations Joint Endeavor, Deny Flight and Joint Guardian in Bosnia-Herzegovina, 1995–2003; Operations Phoenix Scorpion, Phoenix Scorpion III and Desert Fox in Southwest Asia, 1997 and 1998; Operation Allied Force in Kosovo, 1999–present; Operation Enduring Freedom and Operation Noble Eagle, 2001–present; and Operation Iraqi Freedom, 2003–2011, Combined Joint Task Force-Horn of Africa 2010–2011.

The 635th Armor Regiment was constituted in the Air National Guard on March 25, 1953, as the 891st Engineer Aviation Battalion. On August 1, 1953, it was allotted to the Kansas National Guard. It was reorganized and federally recognized January 13, 1954 with headquarters at Manhattan, Kansas. The regiment was redesignated in January 1957 as the 891st Engineer Battalion. It was converted again to the 635th Armor on February 1, 1976, consisting of the 1st Battalion. In 1984 the battalion was part of the 69th Infantry Brigade. It was reorganized again on March 1, 1990, to comprise the 1st and 2nd Battalions at Manhattan and Salina, respectively.

About 350 soldiers of the 1st Battalion, 635th Armor, departed on the first leg of a deployment to Kosovo on October 27, 2004, as part of NATO's peacekeeping operation in the former Yugoslavia. On January 27, 2006, they returned from their 15-month deployment to Kosovo.  While there, they had provided force protection and fixed and roving security, as well as escort duty. In October 2020, the 2nd Combined Arms Battalion, 137th Infantry, was redesignated as the 1st Battalion, 635th Armored, retaining its combined arms status.

The Kansas Army National Guard is commanded by Brigadier General Anthony V. Mohatt. Its chief of staff is Colonel Matt Oleen, and its command sergeant major is Howard Whitley.

Historic units include:
  127th Field Artillery Regiment (deactivated January 28, 2007)
  130th Field Artillery Regiment
  137th Infantry Regiment
  1st Howitzer Battalion, 235th Artillery – Divisional artillery battalion of the 35th Infantry Division 1959–1963. Reorganized from 135th Antiaircraft Artillery Automatic Weapons Battalion, organized 1949, which inherited the lineage of the 635th Tank Destroyer Battalion. Battalion eliminated together with 35th Infantry Division, Headquarters and Headquarters Battery at Hays and Battery A at Russell became 995th Ordnance Company. Heraldry inherited by 235th RTI.
  130th Field Artillery Brigade (reactivated October 19, 2014)  The brigade's history in the Kansas Army National Guard dates back to 1917, where its lineage can be traced through both World Wars as part of the 35th Infantry Division, the Korean War and, most recently, Operation Iraqi Freedom. On June 1, 1978, the 130th was redesignated as the 130th Field Artillery Brigade. In 1985 it was again redesignated as the 35th Division Artillery with the reactivation of the 35th Infantry Division. The 130th was reconstituted again on Sept. 2, 1997, in the Kansas Army National Guard in Topeka. Following its deployment in Operation Iraqi Freedom, the brigade was inactivated on Nov. 10, 2007.
  287th Sustainment Brigade
 1st Battalion, 635th Armor, part of the 40th Infantry Division (California) as of 1998.  This unit was deactivated in September 2008, its former troops becoming part of the 2nd Battalion (Combined Arms Battalion), 137th Infantry Regiment, consisting of two Armor companies and one infantry company; then the battalion was again redesignated back to 1-635 Armor in October 2020.

Units
 The Kansas Army National Guard is authorized more than 5,200 soldiers. Subordinate units within the Kansas Army National Guard include:
 Joint Forces Headquarters-Kansas (Topeka)
 69th Troop Command (Topeka)
 105th Mobile Public Affairs Detachment
 107th Chaplain Detachment
 1074th Field Tactical Data Terminal
 1174th Senior Tactical Data Terminal
 1979th Contingency Contract Team
 35th Infantry Division (Mechanized) (Fort Leavenworth)
 235th Regiment (RTI) (Salina)
 635th Regional Support Group (Topeka)(formed 2005 from previous 35th Infantry Division Artillery)
 Headquarters and Headquarters Detachment
 Detachment 1, 139th Transportation Company (PLS)
 35th Military Police Company
 State Aviation Office
 Army Aviation Support Facility #1
 Detachment 37, OSA
 2nd Battalion, 641st Aviation Regiment
 1st Battalion, 108th Aviation Regiment
 Detachment of Headquarters and Headquarters Company
 Company A
 Company D
 Company E
 Company G, 2nd Battalion (General Support), 135th Aviation Regiment
 Detachment 5, Company D, 1st Battalion, 111th Aviation Regiment
 Detachment 5, Company E, 1st Battalion, 111th Aviation Regiment
 Company G, 1st Battalion, 111th Aviation Regiment
 1st Battalion, 635th Armored Regiment
Headquarters and Headquarters Company (Kansas City)
Detachment 1, Headquarters and Headquarters Company (Junction City)
Company A (Emporia)
Company B (Lawrence)
Company C (Wichita)
Detachment 1, Company C (Lawrence)
Detachment 1, Headquarters and Headquarters Battery, 2nd Battalion, 114th Field Artillery (Junction City)
Company G, 106th Brigade Support Battalion (Manhattan)
Detachment 1, Company G (Kansas City)
 891st Engineer Battalion
 130th Field Artillery Brigade (Manhattan)
 2nd Battalion 130th Field Artillery Regiment
 1st Battalion, 161st Field Artillery Regiment
 169th Combat Support Sustainment Battalion

See also
Kansas State Guard
Lawrence armory

References

External links
 Bibliography of Kansas Army National Guard History compiled by the United States Army Center of Military History
 Online publications of Kansas National Guard and Kansas Adjutant General at State Library of Kansas' KGI Online Library

United States Army National Guard by state
Military in Kansas